The Greater Philadelphia Expo Center at Oaks is an exhibition center located in Oaks, Pennsylvania. It has five adjoining exhibit halls, 9 meeting rooms, two small food courts, and a total area of over 240,000 square feet on one floor. It is among the largest suburban exposition centers on the East Coast of the United States.

References

External links

 

Buildings and structures in Montgomery County, Pennsylvania
Convention centers in Pennsylvania